Idrisa Sidi Sambú (born 27 March 1998) is a Portuguese footballer who plays as a forward for Felgueiras 1932.

Club career

Porto
On 2 April 2015, Sambú  made his professional debut with FC Porto B in a 2015–16 Segunda Liga match against Académico Viseu.

Spartak Moscow
On 23 February 2017, he signed with the Russian Premier League club FC Spartak Moscow. He left Spartak upon the expiration of his contract on 1 June 2020.

Loan to Mouscron
On 29 June 2018, he joined Mouscron on loan for the 2018–19 season.

Gaz Metan
On 28 August 2020, he signed with Romanian club Gaz Metan Mediaș.

References

External links

Stats and profile at LPFP 
National team data 

1998 births
Sportspeople from Bissau
Portuguese people of Bissau-Guinean descent
Bissau-Guinean emigrants to Portugal
Living people
Bissau-Guinean footballers
Portuguese footballers
Portugal youth international footballers
Association football forwards
FC Porto B players
FC Spartak-2 Moscow players
Royal Excel Mouscron players
CS Gaz Metan Mediaș players
U.D. Vilafranquense players
F.C. Felgueiras 1932 players
Liga Portugal 2 players
Russian First League players
Belgian Pro League players
Portuguese expatriate footballers
Expatriate footballers in Russia
Portuguese expatriate sportspeople in Russia
Expatriate footballers in Belgium
Portuguese expatriate sportspeople in Belgium
Expatriate footballers in Romania
Portuguese expatriate sportspeople in Romania